Darcy Kuemper (born May 5, 1990) is a Canadian professional ice hockey goaltender currently playing for the Washington Capitals of the National Hockey League (NHL). He was selected by the Minnesota Wild in the sixth round, 161st overall, of the 2009 NHL Entry Draft. He has also played in the NHL with the Los Angeles Kings, Arizona Coyotes and Colorado Avalanche. Kuemper won the Stanley Cup with the Avalanche in 2022.

Competing internationally with Team Canada, he won gold at the 2021 IIHF World Championship.

Early life 
Kuemper was born on May 5, 1990, in Saskatoon, Saskatchewan, to police officer Brent and accountant Sharon Kuemper. Saskatoon is home to a large ice hockey community, and Kuemper began ice skating by the age of three. In his early youth hockey leagues, players would take various turns at goaltender, and Kuemper always enjoyed his turn. At the age of 10, he decided to become a full-time goaltender. His enjoyment of the position came from the fact that, while other skaters came on and off the ice in shifts, the goaltender was constantly involved in play. As a child, Kuemper often played minor ice hockey alongside fellow Saskatoon natives Luke and Brayden Schenn.

Kuemper's goaltending abilities first attracted attention when he played for the Saskatoon Contacts and Blazers in the Saskatchewan Male U18 AAA Hockey League (SMAAAHL) as an adolescent. During the 2005–06 SMAAAHL season, Kuemper, who split time in net for the Contacts with Carl Jahrus, had a 16-3 record and was third in the league with 2.32 goals against average (GAA). Kuemper and the Blazers came within one game of winning the SMAAAHL championship in 2008, but lost to the Notre Dame Hounds in five games.

Playing career

Junior 
The Spokane Chiefs of the Western Hockey League (WHL) selected Kuemper 45th overall in the 2005 WHL Bantam Draft. With most of his time under contract spent playing in Saskatoon as a WHL prospect, however, Kuemper only had 19 seconds of goal time with Spokane, when he relieved starting goaltender Dustin Tokarski at the end of a period during the 2007 WHL playoffs. On December 13, 2007, Spokane traded Kuemper, who at that point was still playing with the Blazers, to the Red Deer Rebels in exchange for a conditional selection in the 2009 WHL Bantam Draft.

Kuemper started playing in the WHL during the 2008–09 season, backing up Morgan Clark on the Rebels. Halfway through the season, however, he had taken over as the everyday goaltender for Red Deer.

Kuemper played three seasons with the Red Deer Rebels, winning the Del Wilson Trophy in the 2010–11 season as the WHL's top goaltender, as well as the CHL Goaltender of the Year with 45 wins, a goals against average (GAA) of 1.86 and a save percentage of .933.

Professional

Minnesota Wild 
On May 26, 2011, Kuemper signed a three-year, entry-level contract with the Minnesota Wild. On October 13, 2011, he was loaned to the Ontario Reign of the ECHL. Kuemper was later recalled by the Wild on November 12, 2011.

Kuemper was recalled by the Wild on February 12, 2013. After then-backup goaltender Josh Harding had been ill due to complications from multiple sclerosis treatment, the Wild recalled Kuemper to start the same night to relieve Harding and the team's starting goaltender, Niklas Bäckström. Five days later, on February 17, Kuemper made 29 saves on 31 shots to earn his first career NHL win against the Detroit Red Wings.

On May 1, 2013, Kuemper was again recalled by the Wild to back up Josh Harding, who was starting as a result of an injury to Niklas Bäckström. On May 7, Kuemper made his Stanley Cup playoff debut when he replaced Harding, who had suffered a left leg injury in the first period of a game against the Chicago Blackhawks.

In the next season's playoffs, in 2014, Kuemper started in Game 3 of the Wild's Western Conference Quarter-finals matchup against the Colorado Avalanche, replacing Ilya Bryzgalov. Kuemper recorded a shutout in the game, and continued to start for the Wild until sustaining an injury in the third period of Game 7 of the same series. Bryzgalov replaced Kuemper again and was credited with the win upon Minnesota's overtime victory. The following season, Kuemper opened as Minnesota's starter with Bryzgalov departed and Harding unable to play. However, Kuemper struggled, and Minnesota traded for Devan Dubnyk, who immediately became the starter. Kuemper and Niklas Bäckström finished the season splitting time as Dubnyk's backup.

Los Angeles Kings 
On July 1, 2017, Kuemper agreed to a one-year, $650,000 contract with the Los Angeles Kings. In the 2017–18 season, Kuemper excelled in the backup role with the Kings, recording 10 wins in 19 appearances.

Arizona Coyotes 

On February 21, 2018, Kuemper was traded to the Arizona Coyotes for goaltender Scott Wedgewood and forward Tobias Rieder. Kuemper was immediately re-signed to a two-year, $3.7 million extension by the Coyotes.

With Antti Raanta injured for most of the 2018–19 season, Kuemper appeared in a career-high 55 games and posted a 27–20–8 record. He finished fifth in voting for the Vezina Trophy, awarded to the NHL's best goaltender.

On October 2, 2019, the Coyotes signed Kuemper to a two-year, $9 million extension, ahead of the 2019–20 season. He appeared in 29 games with a 16–11–2 record and .928 save percentage before the regular season was prematurely concluded due to the onset of the COVID-19 pandemic. When the 2020 Stanley Cup playoffs were belatedly held in the summer in a bubble in Canada, Kuemper was widely considered the decisive factor in the Coyotes' victory over the Nashville Predators in the qualifying round. He recorded a .933 save percentage across four games where the Predators outshot the Coyotes in each. The Coyotes advanced to face the Colorado Avalanche in the first round, losing in five games. Kuemper recorded a .895 save percentage in the series, but was generally assessed as having performed well in a situation where his team was overmatched, and notably made 49 saves to secure the team's lone win in Game 3.

In the shortened 2020–21 season that would prove to be his final one with the Coyotes, Kuemper played only 27 of 56 games due to an MCL injury. He had only a .907 save percentage, which The Athletic called "serviceable" given the team's poor defense.

Colorado Avalanche 
On July 28, 2021, Kuemper was traded to the Colorado Avalanche in exchange for a 2022 first-round draft pick, a 2024 conditional third-round pick, and defenseman Conor Timmins. He was acquired to replace the team's former starter Philipp Grubauer, who chose to depart in free agency to the Seattle Kraken. While the team performed well from the beginning of the season, Kuemper was considered somewhat shaky, and after an early injury caused him to miss time it raised questions about the stability of the Avalanche's goaltending. However, by the midpoint of the season he was considered to have improved markedly. Kuemper finished with 37 wins (a career high), an overall record of 37–12–4, 5 shutouts, and a .921 save percentage in the regular season, all of which ranked in the top 5 for NHL goaltenders for the season. The Avalanche finished in second overall in the NHL in points and drew the Nashville Predators in the first round of the 2022 Stanley Cup playoffs.

Kuemper won his first two games in the first round against the Predators, but was forced to exit midway through Game 3 after Predators forward Ryan Johansen's stick accidentally slipped through his mask and poked him in the eye. He missed the fourth and final game of the series that completed the Avalanche's sweep of the Predators, but the injury proved to be minor. He returned to the ice for the second round series and led the Avalanche past the St. Louis Blues in 6 games for their first appearance in the third round in 21 years. However, he was forced to again exit during Game 1 of the Western Conference Final series against the Edmonton Oilers. It was announced that he would not play in Game 2, citing an unspecified upper body injury, with backup goaltender Pavel Francouz taking over again. Kuemper returned to the roster for Game 4 as backup to Francouz, where the Avalanche completed their sweep of the Oilers and advanced to the 2022 Stanley Cup Finals. He resumed the role of starter for Game 1 of the Finals against the Tampa Bay Lightning. In Game 4, Kuemper became the first goaltender in NHL history to record an assist on an overtime goal in the Cup Finals, putting his team one win away from the Stanley Cup. In a series-deciding Game 6, Kuemper outdueled Lightning goaltender Andrei Vasilevskiy one final time and stopped 22 of 23 shots as the Avalanche won their third title in franchise history.

Washington Capitals
On July 13, 2022, Kuemper signed as a free agent to a five-year, $26.25 million contract with the Washington Capitals.

On October 29, 2022, Kuemper recorded his first shutout with the Capitals in a 3–0 win against the Nashville Predators.

International play

On April 12, 2018, Kuemper was named to Team Canada's senior team to compete at the 2018 IIHF World Championship. He played 7 games with a .867 save percentage, while Team Canada finished fourth. Kuemper joined Team Canada again for the 2021 IIHF World Championship. He recorded a .916 save percentage in 8 games, helping Team Canada win the gold medal.

Career statistics

Regular season and playoffs

International

Awards and honours

References

External links

1990 births
Arizona Coyotes players
Canadian ice hockey goaltenders
Colorado Avalanche players
Houston Aeros (1994–2013) players
Ice hockey people from Saskatchewan
Iowa Wild players
Living people
Los Angeles Kings players
Minnesota Wild draft picks
Minnesota Wild players
Ontario Reign (ECHL) players
Orlando Solar Bears (ECHL) players
Red Deer Rebels players
Spokane Chiefs players
Sportspeople from Saskatoon
Stanley Cup champions
Tucson Roadrunners players
Washington Capitals players